Bulungu may refer to:
 Bulungu, Kasai-Central, a town in Kasai-Central province of the southern Democratic Republic of the Congo.
 Bulungu, Kwilu, a community in the Kwilu province, Democratic Republic of the Congo
 Bulungu (mammal), a genus of extinct marsupials